Dushyant Singh (born 11 September 1973) is an Indian politician and businessman, presently serving as the Member of Parliament for Jhalawar-Baran in the Lok Sabha. He has been elected to four terms, each time with an increased majority, and is a member of the Bharatiya Janata Party.

Education
Dushyant Singh was educated at The Doon School in Dehradun. He received a Bachelor of Arts in economics from the St. Stephen's College, Delhi and a Master of Business Administration, focusing on hotel management, at Johnson & Wales University in the United States.

Personal life
He is the recognised Yuvraj and future Maharaja of Dholpur. His mother, Vasundhara Raje Scindia, twice served as the Chief Minister of Rajasthan and as a Minister in the Union Cabinet of Atal Bihari Vajpayee. He is the grandson of the Maharaja of Gwalior Jivaji Rao Scindia and Rajmata Vijayaraje Scindia and is also the paternal grandson of the last Maharaja of Nabha, Pratap Singh Nabha.

Mr Singh is married to Niharika Raje the only princess of the Samthar State the daughter of Maharaja Ranjeet Singh Judeo and Ganga Rajya Laxmi, of the Rana dynasty of Nepal. He is known to be fond of dogs. He also maintains an interest in chess and collecting antique books and is also a well-known wildlife enthusiast.

Political career
After returning to India in 2003, Singh followed in the footsteps of his mother and grandmother Vijayaraje Scindia and joined the BJP. He won his very first election and was elected as a Member of Parliament in the year 2004, from the constituency of Jhalawar- Baran in Rajasthan.

In 2009 despite a congress wave, Singh won his second Loksabha Election. Over this period of time, Singh helped bring prosperity to his region through the medium of improved roads, better citywide infrastructure, and good governance. 

In 2014 Singh won his Loksabha seat for a third time with a landslide victory. In 2019 Singh won his Loksabha Seat for a record-breaking fourth time in a row. Singh has in his tenure helped establish railways and even the Kolana Airport of Jhalawar.

References

1973 births
Living people
The Doon School alumni
Bharatiya Janata Party politicians from Rajasthan
India MPs 2004–2009
India MPs 2009–2014
People from Jhalawar district
Rajasthani people
Lok Sabha members from Rajasthan
India MPs 2014–2019
Indian royalty
India MPs 2019–present
Rajasthani politicians
Scindia dynasty of Gwalior